James Peter Maxwell Dornan ( born 1 May 1982) is an actor, model, and musician from Northern Ireland. Formerly a character actor, he often portrays solemn, steady characters. The recipient of two Irish Film and Television Awards, he has been nominated for a BAFTA Television Award, a Golden Globe Award and a Screen Actors Guild Award. In 2020, he was listed at number 32 on The Irish Times list of Ireland's greatest film actors.

Initially beginning his career as a model in 2001, he appeared in campaigns for Hugo Boss, Dior Homme, and Calvin Klein. Dubbed "the Golden Torso" by The New York Times, he was ranked one of the "25 Biggest Male Models of All Time" by Vogue in 2015. In addition, he performed in the folk band Sons of Jim until 2008.

He began acting in 2006, and earned international recognition for playing Sheriff Graham Humbert in the series Once Upon a Time (2011–2013) and serial killer Paul Spector in the crime drama series The Fall (2013–2016). For the latter, he won the Irish Film and Television Award for Best Actor in Television and was nominated for a British Academy Television Award for Best Actor. In film, he has portrayed Axel von Fersen in Sofia Coppola's Marie Antoinette (2006), Christian Grey in the Fifty Shades franchise (2015–2018), Jan Kubiš in Anthropoid (2016), Commandant Pat Quinlan in The Siege of Jadotville (2016), Paul Conroy in A Private War (2018), and Pa in Belfast (2021), receiving a nomination for the Golden Globe Award for Best Supporting Actor – Motion Picture for the lattermost.

Early life
Dornan was born in Holywood, County Down, Northern Ireland, and grew up in the suburbs of Belfast. His mother, Lorna, died of pancreatic cancer when Dornan was 16. His father Jim Dornan, an obstetrician and gynaecologist who had also considered becoming an actor, died from complications related to COVID-19 on 15 March 2021. He has echoed his father's support throughout his career, stating: "...Some people go their whole lives without being told, ‘You've made your parents proud’. My dad would tell me every day."

Dornan has two older sisters: Liesa, who works for Disney in London, and Jessica, a fashion designer based in Falmouth, Cornwall, England. He is a first cousin, twice removed, of actress Greer Garson. His grandparents on both sides of his family were Methodist lay preachers.

He attended and boarded at Methodist College Belfast, where he played rugby and participated in the drama department. In school, he appeared in Christmas Pantomime portraying Widow Twanky which earned him his first drama prize. He also played Baby Face in Bugsy Malone and the milkman in Blood Brothers during school productions. He was a member of Belfast's youth amateur drama group, Holywood Players and participated in Ballymoney's Drama Festival with this group on several occasions. From the age of twelve, he participated in the native production of Anton Chekhov's stage dramas.

He attended Teesside University but dropped out and moved to London in 2002 to train as an actor, but never applied to drama school. He worked in a pub in Knightsbridge for six months until he embarked on his modelling career. Referring to those six months as a rough time, Dornan stated he went through much financial hardship and to make ends meet, he took a job at the pub.

Initial career

Music
Dornan performed in the folk band Sons of Jim until it disbanded in 2008. He founded the band with his schoolmate David Alexander and formed their own record label Doorstep Records under which they published their songs "Fairytale" and "My Burning Sun". Sons of Jim supported Scottish singer-songwriter KT Tunstall on tour.

Modelling
Dornan was not keen to pursue modelling as a career but was persuaded by his step mother and sisters. In 2001, he took part in the Channel 4 reality show Model Behaviour. He was eliminated but signed a modelling contract with Select Model Management. In 2003, he modelled for Abercrombie & Fitch with Malin Åkerman. He then modelled for Aquascutum, Hugo Boss, and Armani. In 2005, he became the face of Dior Homme's fragrance advertising campaign. Dornan's first appearance in Calvin Klein's advertising campaign was in 2004 with Russian model Natalia Vodianova. His later notable works for Calvin Klein include the jeans advertising campaigns with Kate Moss in 2006 and with Eva Mendes in 2010. In 2009, he was made the face of Calvin Klein's 'CK Free' fragrance and appeared solo in Calvin Klein's underwear campaign. In 2006, he was labelled "The Golden Torso" by The New York Times. He also appeared as a judge in Calvin Klein's model hunt competition, 'Nine countries, nine men, one winner'.

Dornan appeared in commercials for Dolce & Gabbana, Zara, Banana Republic, Dior, Calvin Klein, and Levi's Jeans. In 2006, he was dubbed the "male Kate Moss" by GQ and in 2015 was ranked one of the "25 Biggest Male Models of All Time" by Vogue. He was ranked 3rd and 15th on GQ's 50 best dressed British men list respectively in 2015 and 2016. In 2018, he became the new face of "Boss The Scent" for Hugo Boss alongside Dutch model Birgit Kos. During his career, he worked with fashion photographers Terry Richardson, Bruce Weber, Carter Smith, as well as designer Hedi Slimane. Dornan's modelling significance was his look which was named "Dornan Furrow" by the industry and the media. He never participated in ramp walks because of his unconventional style of walking.

Acting career

2006–2012: Career beginnings

Being a "model turned actor", Dornan stated that the designation held significant stigma concerning such transition. He struggled with auditions and casting agents who treated him only as a model, but he had always wanted to act and was steadfast in proving his acting abilities. He moved to Los Angeles with a view to building an acting career in comedy, which eventually never happened. He had also written a comic blog for Funny or Die that did not get published. His first acting role in a film was as Count Axel Fersen in the Sofia Coppola film Marie Antoinette (2006). He also appeared in the drama film Shadows in the Sun (2009) alongside Jean Simmons. In 2008, he played the lead role of Ed in the Hammer Horror production Beyond the Rave.

Dornan garnered recognition when he appeared in nine episodes of the ABC television series Once Upon a Time between 2011 and 2013, playing the role of the Huntsman/Sheriff Graham. While Graham was killed by the town's mayor Regina/the Evil Queen in the episode "The Heart Is a Lonely Hunter", Dornan stated that he would return as the Huntsman from the Enchanted Forest at some point. He returned as the Huntsman for the season finale "A Land Without Magic", and later as Graham for the season two episode "Welcome to Storybrooke" in its flashback segment. About his performance, Laura Prudom of The Huffington Post wrote: "Irish-born Jamie Dornan did an excellent job of portraying Graham's hopelessness and confusion".

2013–2015: Breakthrough with The Fall and Fifty Shades trilogy

Dornan received critical acclaim when he starred alongside Gillian Anderson in the Northern Irish drama series The Fall, playing Paul Spector, a serial killer terrorising Belfast. He initially auditioned for the role of a police officer, but he was later called upon to audition for the lead role, for which he was eventually selected. Beginning in 2013, the show aired for three series ending in October 2016. He read books about serial killers and watched interviews of Ted Bundy to get an understanding of the mindset of his character, and stalked a woman in his preparation for the role. Reviewing the first season, David Thomson of The New Republic complimented Dornan on his performance: "Jamie Dornan as Paul, has become the center of the drama in a performance that unpeels as slowly as a stripper- and maybe as seductively." He won his first Irish Film and Television Award for Best Actor in Television and was nominated for a British Academy Television Award for Best Actor. He credited The Fall to be the turning point of his career. In 2014, Dornan was cast as Abe Goffe in New Worlds, a historical drama series.

On 23 October 2013, Dornan was cast as Christian Grey in the film adaptation of Fifty Shades of Grey, replacing Charlie Hunnam. Initially announced to be released on 1 August 2014, the film was later rescheduled and released on 13 February 2015. He visited a private sex dungeon as preparation for playing his sadistic character. He reprised his role in the second and third installments of the Fifty Shades film franchise, Fifty Shades Darker, released in 2017, and Fifty Shades Freed, released in 2018. Earning approximately $1.32 billion, the franchise became the seventh highest-grossing R-rated franchise. Despite being a box office blockbuster, the trilogy was poorly received by critics, with Dornan's performance being critically panned. He later stated that he was reluctant about his involvement in the project and knew the franchise would not be treated well by critics. But he said:"...it’s given me so much beyond finance-wise, I mean that opportunity to then do the movies...movies like that have so much heart and mean so much to me. I would not have been given those opportunities if I hadn’t done Fifty Shades."

Dornan played Dr. Allan Pascal in a Miramax film titled The 9th Life of Louis Drax, a supernatural thriller based on a book of the same name. It was released in 2016.

2016–present: Transition to independent film roles and Belfast 
Dornan was cast as Commandant Pat Quinlan in Netflix's historical war film The Siege of Jadotville in 2016. He was sent to a boot camp in South Africa with the rest of the cast to train for the film. The film got released at the Galway Film Festival 2016, receiving mixed reviews. Writing for The Irish Times, critic Donald Clarke took note of Dornan's suave acting. For the film, he received his third nomination for best actor in a leading role in Irish Film and Television Award. In the same year, he starred as Jan Kubiš, alongside Cillian Murphy in another war film Anthropoid. Rupert Hawksley of The Daily Telegraph felt that he made a decent fist of portraying Kubis and said: "Nazi nail-biter Anthropoid shows Jamie Dornan has many more than 50 shades". For the film, he received nominations for the British Independent Film Award and Czech Lion Award for Best Supporting Actor.

In 2018, Dornan co-starred alongside Peter Dinklage, as a journalist Danny Tate, in the HBO television film My Dinner with Hervé, written and directed by Sacha Gervasi. The film narrated a fictional take on Gervasi's interview with actor Hervé Villechaize in 1993, days before his suicide. Matthew Gilbert of The Boston Globe said: "The Danny plot is fine - nothing special really, although Dornan is excellent and manages to bring a good sense of transformation to an underwritten character". In the same year, Dornan portrayed journalist Paul Conroy in the biographical drama A Private War. Ann Hornaday, writing for The Washington Post, described Dornan's performance as "a gallantly self-effacing performance". Kenneth Turan for Los Angeles Times described Dornan's performance as "excellent work from the Fifty Shades veteran". Later that year, he appeared as Will Scarlet in Robin Hood and as Nick, a doctor and memoirist, in Untogether.

In 2019, Dornan starred as a paramedic in the science fiction thriller film Synchronic. It had its world premiere at the 44th Toronto International Film Festival, receiving positive reviews from critics. He also played the role of an Irish writer in the semi-improvised romantic drama Endings, Beginnings that year.

Dornan then appeared in two comedy films, Wild Mountain Thyme (2020) and Barb and Star Go to Vista Del Mar (2021). He won plaudits from critics for his musical number and comedic turn in Barb and Star. Writing for TheWrap, Alonso Duralde addressed his ballad as "a definite highlight" of the film and said: "While it's definitely [Annie] Mumolo and [Kristen] Wiig's show all the way, Dornan winds up being surprisingly capable at holding his own against these two dynamos". Wild Mountain Thyme, John Patrick Shanley's film adaptation of his own play Outside Mullingar, was poorly received and was criticised for accent inaccuracy. Nevertheless, Simran Hans of The Guardian described Dornan's performance as "a commendable feat of comic brilliance, not to be missed." Some critics supposed him to be a miscast.

In 2021, Dornan portrayed a working class father in Kenneth Branagh's drama film Belfast, the character being based on Branagh's father. His performance received critical acclaim. Critic Peter Travers wrote on Good Morning America: "Dornan, free of the s&m sex trap of the 50 Shades of Grey trilogy, builds on his virtuoso turn on The Fall to show an actor of ferocity and feeling as he invests Pa, often absent from home for construction work in England, with simmering emotion and quiet strength". He received nominations for the Golden Globe Award and Critics' Choice Movie Award for Best Supporting Actor. The film was nominated for Best Picture at the 94th Academy Awards.

After Belfast, he secured the lead role of an amnesiac in BBC thriller series The Tourist. Upon its release on BBC iPlayer in January 2022, it became the most watched show of that month with highest ratings until then. He himself and critics alike found his character challenging. In a review for The Guardian, TV critic Lucy Mangan highlighted Dornan's "compelling performance" and found him in "fine form".

Charitable work
Dornan has lent his support towards various means and organisations. He was the patron of TinyLife, a Northern Ireland charity for premature and vulnerable babies. In 2017, he participated in a charity football match, Game 4 Grenfell, to provide aid to the victims of Grenfell Tower fire in West London that year.

In 2018, Dornan became the patron of the newly established charity Northern Ireland Pancreatic Cancer (NIPanC) which was created in partnership with Pancreatic Cancer Action and the Pancreatic Cancer Research Fund. Due to busy filming schedule, he stepped down from the patronage in 2021 but considered himself a strong supporter of it. In 2020, Dornan read a bedtime story as part of Save with Stories to raise funds for Save the Children's Emergency Coronavirus Appeal. In the same year, he supported the Faster 5K Friday campaign for the Care Workers Charity, which provides financial grants for care workers.

Dornan appeared in annual fundraising events Red Nose Day by Comic Relief and Children in Need by BBC. He has also backed emergency campaigns providing help for children's treatment.

Personal life and other ventures

In 2003, Dornan met actress Keira Knightley in an Asprey photoshoot. After being together for two years, they split up in 2005. In 2010, Dornan met English actress and singer-songwriter Amelia Warner and they became engaged in 2012, and married in 2013. They have three daughters. Dornan is an atheist. In interviews he has said that he considers himself Irish. 

He launched his menswear clothing line 'Eleven Eleven' in 2022.

Authored article

Acting credits and awards

Dornan's most acclaimed films, according to review aggregate site Rotten Tomatoes, include A Private War (2018), Belfast (2021), My Dinner with Hervé (2018), Barb and Star Go to Vista Del Mar (2021) and Synchronic (2019). His critically lauded television works are The Fall (2013–2016) and Once Upon a Time (2011).

Dornan has won two Irish Film and Television Awards, a Broadcasting Press Guild Award and a People's Choice Award.

He was nominated in the Best Actor category of the 60th BAFTA Awards for his performance in The Fall.

References

External links

 
 

Living people
1982 births
20th-century people from Northern Ireland
21st-century people from Northern Ireland
Alumni of Teesside University
Atheists from Northern Ireland
Male actors from Northern Ireland
Male film actors from Northern Ireland
Male models
Male singers from Northern Ireland
Male television actors from Northern Ireland
Models from Northern Ireland
People educated at Methodist College Belfast
People from County Down
Select Model Management models